Baqerabad-e Olya (also Romanized as Bāqerābād-e ‘Olyā) is a village in Hasanabad Rural District, in the Central District of Eslamabad-e Gharb County, Kermanshah Province, Iran. At the 2006 census, its population was 594, in 124 families.

References 

Populated places in Eslamabad-e Gharb County